Meols railway station is a station serving the village of Meols, in Merseyside, England. It lies on the West Kirby branch of the Wirral Line, part of the Merseyrail network.

History

Meols was one of the original stations on the Hoylake Railway, opening in 1866.  The Hoylake Railway became part of the Wirral Railway in 1883, which subsequently became part of the London Midland and Scottish Railway in 1923.  Through services to Liverpool began in 1938, when the line was electrified.  The station was rebuilt to coincide with this.

In 1934 the signal box was closed and semaphore Intermediate Block Signals, controlled from Moreton and Hoylake boxes, were introduced, the only such signals on the Liverpool to West Kirby line. They broke the otherwise long distance between Moreton and Hoylake, the two signal boxes on either side. These semaphore signals remained until 1994 when the line was resignalled with colour-light signals. The station underwent refurbishment with work in 2010 which involved new glazing to the footbridge windows and staircase, redevelopment of existing buildings to provide enclosed passenger waiting shelters, a new passenger toilet and automatic entrance doors to the booking hall.
Work began on installing lifts for both of the platforms in 2019 and the lifts opened for use in January 2020.

Facilities
The station is staffed, 15 minutes before the first train and 15 minutes after the last train, and has platform CCTV. Each of the two platforms has a waiting room. There is a payphone, vending machine, booking office and live departure and arrival screens, for passenger information. The station has a free car park, with 62 spaces, as well as a 12-space cycle rack and secure indoor storage for 16 cycles. Lifts serve both platforms allowing for step free access from the ticket office and upper road level.

Services
Current services are every 15 minutes (Monday to Saturday daytime) to West Kirby and Liverpool.  At other times, trains operate every 30 minutes. These services are provided by Merseyrail's fleet of Class 507 and Class 508 EMUs.

References

Further reading

External links 

Railway stations in the Metropolitan Borough of Wirral
DfT Category E stations
Former Wirral Railway stations
Railway stations in Great Britain opened in 1866
Railway stations in Great Britain closed in 1870
Railway stations in Great Britain opened in 1872
Railway stations served by Merseyrail
1866 establishments in England